Huger is a surname of French origin. It may refer to:

Five brothers from a prominent South Carolina family of Huguenot descent who served in the American Revolution:
Benjamin Huger (American Revolution), killed near Charleston
Daniel Huger, member of the Continental Congress and United States Congress
Francis Huger (1751–1811)
Isaac Huger, a Continental Army officer, Continental Congressman and United States Marshal
John Huger (1744–1804)

And their descendants:
Benjamin Huger (congressman), a United States Representative from South Carolina
Francis Kinloch Huger, a physician and artillery officer
Benjamin Huger (general), a United States Army and Confederate Army officer from South Carolina
Daniel Elliott Huger, a United States Representative from South Carolina
Thomas B. Huger, a United States Navy and Confederate Navy officer from South Carolina

See also
Huger, South Carolina

Surnames
Surnames from given names